Hokomo is a former Maidu settlement in Butte County, California. It was located on the east side of Middle Fork of the Feather River almost due north of Mooretown, California (now Feather Falls); its precise location is unknown.

See also
Mooretown Rancheria of Maidu Indians

References

Former settlements in Butte County, California
Former Native American populated places in California
Maidu villages
Lost Native American populated places in the United States